Hans-Dieter Beutel (born 12 June 1962) is a former professional tennis player from West Germany.

Career
Beutel was a losing finalist in the 1980 Wimbledon boys' singles event, to Frenchman Thierry Tulasne.

In 1981, Beutel made the semi-finals of the Sofia Open.

He was the German National Champion in 1982, for both indoor and outdoor singles and in the outdoor doubles. Also that year he reached the quarter-finals in Linz and was a doubles runner-up in Cologne.

Beutel was a singles finalist at Cologne in 1983, beating Carlos Kirmayr, Shlomo Glickstein, Eric Jelen and Pavel Složil en route. He made the quarter-finals at Båstad the following year.

He won two Grand Slam matches during his career, both at the Australian Open. In the 1984 tournament, he defeated countryman Jelen in the opening round, before going down to Tarik Benhabiles in five sets. At the 1989 Australian Open he came from two sets down to overcome Laurent Prades in the first round. He was eliminated in the second round by 14th seed Jonas Svensson.

The West German appeared in five Davis Cup ties for his national team in the early 1980s, winning three of his eight rubbers, one in singles and two in doubles.

Grand Prix career finals

Singles: 1 (0–1)

Doubles: 1 (0–1)

Challenger titles

Singles: (2)

Doubles: (1)

References

External links
 
 
 

1962 births
Living people
West German male tennis players
People from Esslingen am Neckar
Sportspeople from Stuttgart (region)
Tennis people from Baden-Württemberg